Bilal Hachem (born 19 July 1968) is a Lebanese football coach and former player who is the goalkeeper coach of  club Ahed.

Club career 
After having spent many years at Safa, Hachem joined Ahed in 2001, playing for them at least until 2007. He also played futsal for them in 2008.

Coaching career 
Hachem was the goalkeeper coach of the Lebanon national under-17 team in 2016, the national under-19 team in 2017, the national beach soccer team at the 2019 AFC Beach Soccer Championship, and Ahed in 2020.

Personal life 
His brother, Yehia, also played football.

See also
 List of association football families

References

External links
 
 
 

1968 births
Living people
Lebanese footballers
Lebanese men's futsal players
Association football goalkeepers
Futsal goalkeepers
Safa SC players
Al Ahed FC players
Lebanese Premier League players
Lebanon international footballers
Association football goalkeeping coaches